Carlos Andrés Rúa Flores (born May 21, 1992) is a Colombian football midfielder who currently plays for Plaza Amador.

References

External links

1992 births
Living people
Colombian footballers
Latvian Higher League players
Categoría Primera B players
Categoría Primera A players
Liga Panameña de Fútbol players
FK Spartaks Jūrmala players
FC Salyut Belgorod players
PFC Spartak Nalchik players
Llaneros F.C. players
Tigres F.C. footballers
Deportivo Pasto footballers
C.D. Plaza Amador players
Colombian expatriate footballers
Expatriate footballers in Latvia
Expatriate footballers in Russia
Expatriate footballers in Panama
Association football midfielders